Lost Girls is a 2020 American mystery drama film. Lost Girls was directed by Liz Garbus, from a screenplay by Michael Werwie, and based on the book Lost Girls: An Unsolved American Mystery by Robert Kolker. The film revolves around the murders of young female sex workers on the South Shore barrier islands of Long Island, committed by the Long Island serial killer, who remains unidentified.

Lost Girls stars Amy Ryan as the real life activist Mari Gilbert, along with Thomasin McKenzie, Lola Kirke, Oona Laurence, Dean Winters, Miriam Shor, Reed Birney, Kevin Corrigan, and Gabriel Byrne. The film premiered at the Sundance Film Festival on January 28, 2020, and was later released on March 13, 2020, by Netflix.

Premise
Mari Gilbert relentlessly drives law enforcement agents to search for her missing daughter, Shannan, and, in the process, sheds light on a wave of unsolved murders of young female sex workers on the South Shore barrier islands of Long Island, committed by the Long Island serial killer.

Cast
 Amy Ryan as Mari Gilbert
 Thomasin McKenzie as Sherre Gilbert
 Gabriel Byrne as Commissioner Richard Dormer
 Oona Laurence as Sarra Gilbert
 Lola Kirke as Kim
 Miriam Shor as Lorraine
 Reed Birney as Dr. Peter Hackett
 Kevin Corrigan as Joe Scalise
 Rosal Colon as Selena Garcia
 Dean Winters as Dean Bostick
 Sarah Wisser as Shannan Gilbert
 Austyn Johnson as Young Shannan Gilbert
 James Hiroyuki Liao as Michael Pak 
 Molly Brown as Missy

Production
In March 2016, it was announced that Liz Garbus would direct the film, from a screenplay by Michael Werwie, based on the book of the same name by Robert Kolker. Kevin McCormack, David Kennedy, Rory Koslow, Amy Nauiokas, and Anne Carey served as producers on the film, while Pamela Hirsch executive produced. Amazon Studios was initially set to distribute. In February 2017, Sarah Paulson was set to star in the film as real-life activist Mari Gilbert. In May 2018, Amy Ryan replaced Paulson, and Netflix was set as the distributor. In October 2018, Thomasin McKenzie (who dropped out of Top Gun: Maverick to work on the film), Gabriel Byrne, Oona Laurence, Lola Kirke, Miriam Shor, Reed Birney, Kevin Corrigan, and Rosal Colon joined the cast.

Filming
Principal photography began on October 15, 2018, in New York City.

Release
The film had its world premiere at the Sundance Film Festival on January 28, 2020, and was released on March 13, 2020, by Netflix.

Critical reception
The website's critical consensus reads, "Raw yet rewarding, Lost Girls overcomes uneven storytelling with powerful performances and a willingness to resist easy catharsis." On Metacritic, the film holds a rating of 69 out of 100, based on 13 critics, indicating "generally favorable reviews."

References

External links
 
 
 
 

2020 films
2020 drama films
2020s mystery drama films
American mystery drama films
Films based on non-fiction books
Films directed by Liz Garbus
Films set in Long Island
Films shot in New Jersey
Films shot in New York (state)
English-language Netflix original films
2020s English-language films
2020s American films